The Regional Council of Provence-Alpes-Côte d'Azur is the deliberative assembly of the French region of Provence-Alpes-Côte d'Azur. The regional council is made up of 123 regional councillors elected for 6 years by direct universal suffrage. It has been chaired by Renaud Muselier, formerly of The Republicans, since 2017.

The Provence-Alpes-Côte d'Azur region is a founding member of the Alps–Mediterranean Euroregion, created on 10 October 2007.

Headquarters 
The Regional Council of Provence-Alpes-Côte d'Azur sits at the Hôtel de Région located in Marseille, 27 Place Jules-Guesde, near the Belsunce district. The Hôtel de Région is served by the Colbert – Hôtel de Région Marseille Metro station.

Presidents

Vice-Presidents

Distribution 
The 123 seats of the Council are distributed by department: as follows:

 4 advisers for the Alpes-de-Haute-Provence
 4 advisers for the Hautes-Alpes
 28 advisers for the Alpes-Maritimes
 47 advisers for the Bouches-du-Rhône
 27 advisers for the Var
 13 advisers for Vaucluse

Sash 

The regional advisers of Provence-Alpes-Côte d'Azur wear a two-tone sash, red and gold. Unlike the tricolor sash of parliamentarians and municipal elected officials, the wearing of the regional sash is not sanctioned by an official text.

Regional Youth Parliament 

The regional youth parliament was created in 2017 by the president of the regional council, Renaud Muselier. Its aim is to contribute to regional public policies on themes that directly or indirectly concern young people in the Provence-Alpes-Côte d'Azur region. It allows young parliamentarians to discover the functioning of the regional authority, within the framework of an active citizenship and to bring out projects carried out by young people.

Parliament meets in the form of plenary assemblies, factories and workshops. It has an operating council. It can also meet ad hoc working groups on an ad hoc basis. In July 2017, an autonomy budget was allocated to the Regional Youth Parliament so that it could carry out its projects.

The young parliamentarians, numbering 80, represent the region with regard to the demographic weight of their training sector in the regional territory (public / private high schools, CFA of the region and students in health and social facilities), as well as with respect of the principle of parity between women and men and of territorial balance. The term of office is one year, renewable once.

References 

Provence-Alpes-Cote d'Azur
Organizations based in Provence-Alpes-Côte d'Azur
Politics of Provence-Alpes-Côte d'Azur